is a Japanese footballer currently playing as a midfielder for Fujieda MYFC.

Career statistics

Club
.

Notes

References

External links

1999 births
Living people
Association football people from Kanagawa Prefecture
Japanese footballers
Japan youth international footballers
Association football midfielders
J3 League players
Japan Football League players
Yokohama F. Marinos players
Blaublitz Akita players
Fujieda MYFC players